Charles Albert Murray (June 22, 1872 – July 29, 1941), was an American film actor of the silent era.

Murray was born in Laurel, Indiana, on June 22, 1872, to Isaac Murray and  Martha Ellen "Mollie" Murray (née Sullenburger).

Murray was a comedian in vaudeville and on stage for 20 years, forming the Murray and Mack team, before he began acting in films. His first work in films was for Biograph. His work in films included appearing in The Cohens and Kellys series with George Sidney. He appeared in more than 280 films between 1912 and 1938, starting with film shorts. He also directed five films.

Murray was married to Nellie Bae Hamilton. He died in Los Angeles, California, from pneumonia. For his contribution to motion pictures, decades after his death, he was honored with a star on the Hollywood Walk of Fame at 1725 Vine Street.

Selected filmography

 His Auto's Maiden Trip (1912, Short)
 Safe in Jail (1913, Short)
 Murphy's I.O.U. (1913, Short) - (uncredited)
 Red Hicks Defies the World (1913, Short) - Red Hicks
 Almost a Wild Man (1913, Short) - McDoo
 The Mothering Heart (1913, Short) - Male Apache Dancer
 Professor Bean's Removal (1913, Short)
 The Riot (1913, Short)
 With the Aid of Phrenology (1913, Short) The Husband
 Two Old Tars (1913, Short)
 Her Friend the Bandit (1914, Short) - Count De Beans
 Mabel's Married Life (1914, Short) - Man in Bar
 Love and Bullets (1914, Short) - Charlie
 The Masquerader (1914, Short) - Film Director
 His New Profession (1914, Short) - Drinker (uncredited)
 Killing Horace (1914, Short) - Horace
 Fatty Again (1914, Short) - Carnival Customer
 The Noise of Bombs (1914, Short) - Constable Murray
 Tillie's Punctured Romance (1914) - Detective in 'A Thief's Fate' (uncredited)
 Rum and Wall Paper (1915, Short) - The Paperhanger
 Hogan's Romance Upset (1915, Short) - Hogan
 Their Social Splash (1915, Short) - Hogan - the Unruly Guest
 Fatty and the Broadway Stars (1915, Short) - Sam Bernard's Director
 Watch Your Neighbor (1918) - M. Balmer, an Undertaker
 Yankee Doodle in Berlin (1919) - An Irish-American Soldier
 Puppy Love (1919) - Shamus O'Connell
 Salome vs. Shenandoah (1919) - 'Herod'
 Married Life (1920) - Patron of the Arts
 Love, Honor and Behave (1920) - His Honor - Judge Fawcett
 A Small Town Idol (1921) - Sheriff Wilbur Sparks
 Home Talent (1921) - The Landlord
 The Crossroads of New York (1922) - Judge
 Luck (1923) - The Plumber
 Bright Lights of Broadway (1923) - El Jumbo
 Painted People (1924) - Tom Byrne
 Lilies of the Field (1924) - Charles Lee
 Fools Highway (1924) - Mamie's Father
 The Girl in the Limousine (1924) - The Butler
 The Fire Patrol (1924) - Fireman
 Empty Hearts (1924) - Joe Delane
 The Mine with the Iron Door (1924) - Bob Hill
 Sundown (1924) - Pat Meech
 Wizard of Oz (1925) - Wizard of Oz
 Who Cares (1925) - Greaves
 Percy (1925) - Holy Joe
 My Son (1925) - Captain Joe Barnby
White Fang (1925) - Judson Black
 Fighting the Flames (1925) - Pawnbroker
 Paint and Powder (1925) - Cabman
 Classified (1925) - Old Man Comet
 Why Women Love (1925) - Josiah Scott
 Steel Preferred (1925) - Dicker
 Mike (1926) - Father
 Irene (1926) - Pa O'Dare
 The Reckless Lady (1926) - Gendarme
 The Devil's Circus (1926) - Circus Member (uncredited)
 The Cohens and Kellys (1926) - Patrick Kelly
 Her Second Chance (1926) - Bell
 The Boob (1926) - Cactus Jim
 Sweet Daddies (1926) - Patrick O'Brien
 Mismates (1926) - Black
 Subway Sadie (1926) - Taxicab Driver
 Paradise (1926) - Lord Lumley
 The Silent Lover (1926) - O'Reilly
 The Masked Woman (1927) - André O'Donohue
 McFadden's Flats (1927) - Dan McFadden
 Lost at the Front (1927) - Patrick Muldoon
 The Poor Nut (1927) - Doc Murphy
 The Gorilla (1927) - Garrity
 The Life of Riley (1927) - Timothy Riley (fire chief)
 The Cohens and the Kellys in Paris (1928) - Minor Role
 The Pioneer Scout (1928) - Minor Role
 Flying Romeos (1928) - Cohan
 Vamping Venus (1928) - Michael Cassidy / King Cassidy of Ireland
 The Head Man (1928) - Watts
 Do Your Duty (1928) - Tim Maloney
 The Cohens and the Kellys in Scotland (1930) - Kelly
 Clancy in Wall Street (1930) - Michael Clancy
 King of Jazz (1930) - Comic Specialty (scenes deleted)
 Around the Corner (1930) - O'Grady
 The Cohens and the Kellys in Africa (1930) - Kelly
 Caught Cheating (1931) - T. McGillicuddy Hungerford
 The Stolen Jools (1931, Short) - Kell
 The Cohens and Kellys in Hollywood (1932) - Michael Kelly
 The Cohens and Kellys in Trouble (1933) - Captain Patrick Kelly
 Dangerous Waters (1936) - Chief Engineer McDuffy
 Circus Girl (1937) - Slippery
 County Fair (1937) - Sheriff
 Breaking the Ice (1938) - Janitor

References

External links

Charles Murray at Virtual History

1872 births
1941 deaths
American male film actors
American male silent film actors
Deaths from pneumonia in California
People from Franklin County, Indiana
20th-century American male actors
Male actors from Indiana